Kator Football Club is a South Sudanese football club located in Juba, South Sudan which currently plays in the South Sudan Football Championship.

The club is regarded as one of the most successful clubs in the league alongside its fierce rivals Atlabara Fc and Malakia Fc.
Kator FC were runners up to Al-Salam FC in the 2017 season this is the greatest achievement of the team since also losing to Al-Salam FC in 2011 South Sudan National Cup

Ownership

On 4 December 2016. Mr. Makiir Gai Thiep was appointed chairman in a bid to develop the club.

Stadium
Currently the team plays at the 12,000 capacity Juba Stadium.

Current squad
Dida Santalino 
Juma Farouk
Nimir kenyi 
Ndi Joseph 
Jule Emmanuel 
Philip Delfino 
Arike Patrick
Thiep Jones
Gai Kiir Gai 
Joseph Kalisto 
Jimmy Natali 
Kaka Ismail 
Koffi 
Guaya Emma

References

External links

Logo Kator FC

Football clubs in South Sudan